Phosphoenolpyruvic carboxykinase may refer to:

 Phosphoenolpyruvate carboxykinase (diphosphate), an enzyme
 Phosphoenolpyruvate carboxykinase (ATP), an enzyme